( nāśīʾ) is a Hebrew title meaning "prince" in Biblical Hebrew, "Prince [of the Sanhedrin]" in Mishnaic Hebrew, or "president" in Modern Hebrew.

Usage

Genesis and ancient Israel
The noun nasi (including its grammatical variations), occurs 132 times in the Masoretic Text of the Hebrew Bible, and in English is usually translated "prince," occasionally "captain."

In the Book of Leviticus, in the rites of sacrifices for leaders who err, there is the special offering made by a "nasi".

In the Book of Numbers, the leader of each tribe is referred to as a nasi, and each one brings a gift to the Tabernacle. In , occurring 38 years later in the Biblical story, the nesi'im of each tribe are listed again, as the leaders responsible for apportioning tribal inheritances.

Later in the history of ancient Israel, the title of nasi was given to the political ruler of Judea. Similarly, the Mishnah defines the nasi of Leviticus 4 to mean the king.

Second Temple period
During the Second Temple period ( BCE – 70 CE),  the nasi was the highest-ranking member and president of the Sanhedrin, or Assembly, including when it sat as a criminal court. The position was created in c. 191 BCE when the Sanhedrin lost confidence in the ability of the High Priest to serve as its head. The office of nasi in the Land of Israel was comparable with the office of exilarch in Babylonia. The Romans recognized the nasi as Patriarch of the Jews, and required all Jews to pay him a tax for the upkeep of that office, which ranked highly in the Roman official hierarchy.

Late Roman empire
This position as patriarch or head of court was reestablished several years after the Bar-Kokhba revolt. This made the nasi a power which both Jews and Romans respected. The Jewish community in Babylonia also recognized him. The nasi had controlled leadership and served as a political representative to the authorities while the religious leadership was led by Torah scholars. The nasi had the power to appoint and suspend communal leaders inside and outside of Israel. The Romans respected the nasi and gave extra land and let control of own self-supported taxes. Under Jewish law, the intercalary thirteenth month in the Hebrew calendar, Adar Bet, was announced by the nasi.

Gamaliel VI was the last nasi. He died in 425 CE, after which Emperor Theodosius II suppressed the office of the patriarchate. The patriarchal tax was diverted to the Roman treasury from 426.

Middle Ages
The term nasi was later applied to those who held high offices in the Jewish community, and Jews who held prominence in the courts of non-Jewish rulers. Certain great figures from Jewish history have used the title, including Judah the Prince (Judah haNasi), the chief redactor of the Mishnah.

The nasi were also prevalent during the 8th-century Frankish kingdom. They were a highly privileged group in Carolingian France. The Jews collaborated with King Pepin to end Muslim rule over their city in 759. The Jews accepted surrender and Pepin was able to hold off the Saracens in the Iberian peninsula. Pepin rewarded the Jews with land and privileges such as the right to judicial and religious autonomy under rule of their own leadership. The heirs of the King and nasi held a close relationship until the tenth century.

17th–20th-century Jewish community in Yemen
According to ethnologist Erich Brauer, among the Jews of Yemen, the title of nasi was conferred upon a man belonging to the community's most noble and richest family. There was no direct election for this post. In general, the nasi was also a scholar, well-versed in Torah, but this was not a condition for his office. Among his duties, he was a representative of the community in all its affairs before the government. He was also entrusted with the duty of collecting the annual poll-tax (ğizya), as also to settle disputes arising between members of the community.

Chabad
The term Nasi was used by Rabbi Menachem Mendel Schneersohn to refer to the spiritual leaders of the Chabad movement. In particular, he used the term "Nesi Hador" ("the prince of the generation") or "Nesi doreinu" ("the prince of our generation") to refer to his father-in-law, Rabbi Yosef Yitzchak Schneersohn. This phrase was later adopted by the Rebbe's own followers to refer to Rabbi M. M. Schneersohn himself.

Modern Hebrew
In Modern Hebrew, nasi means "president", and is not used in its classical sense. The word Nasi is used, in Israel, as the title of the Head of State and Chief Justice of the Supreme Court.

Much more recently, Rabbi Adin Steinsaltz took the title nasi in an attempt to re-establish the Sanhedrin in its judicial capacity as the Supreme Court of Judaism.

List of Nesi'im
During the Mishnaic period, the office of nasi was filled as follows:

List of presidents of Israel:

Rabban
Rabban was a higher title than rabbi and was given to the nasi starting with Gamaliel the Elder.

The title rabban was restricted in usage to the descendants of Hillel the Elder, the sole exception being Rabban Yochanan ben Zakai (c. 30–90 CE), the leader in Jerusalem during the Siege of Jerusalem in 70 CE and who safeguarded the future of the Jewish people after the Great Revolt by pleading with the Emperor Vespasian.

Rabbi Eleazar ben Azariah, who was nasi between 118 and 120 CE, was not given the title rabban, perhaps because he only occupied the office of nasi for a short while, after which it reverted to the descendants of Hillel.

Prior to Rabban Gamliel the Elder, no titles were used before anyone's name, in line with the Talmudic adage "Gadol miRabban shmo" ("Greater than the title rabban is a person's own name"). For this reason, Hillel the Elder has no title before his name: his name is in itself a title. Similarly, Moses and Abraham have no titles before their names, but an epithet is sometimes used to differentiate between biblical and historic personages, hence Avraham Avinu (Abraham 'Our Father') and Moshe Rabbeinu (Moses 'Our Teacher').

Starting with Rabbi Judah I haNasi (born 135 CE), not even the nasi was given the title rabban. In its place, Judah haNasi was given the lofty accolade Rabbeinu HaKadosh ('Our Holy Teacher').

See also
 Modern attempts to revive the Sanhedrin

References

Further reading
Jeremy Cohen, "The Nasi of Narbonne: A Problem in Medieval Historiography," AJS Review, 2 (1977): pp. 45–76,

Jones, Lindsay, ed. Encyclopedia of Religion. Detroit: Gale, 2005. s.v. "Yehudah Ha-Nasi."

Pearl, Chaim, ed. The Encyclopedia of Jewish Life and Thought. New York: Digitalia, Inc., 1996. s.v. "Judah the Prince (Judah Ha-Nasi)."

Pearl, Chaim, ed. The Encyclopedia of Jewish Life and Thought. New York: Digitalia, Inc., 1996. s.v. "Prince (Heb. Nasi)."

External links
 Sanhedrin history
 Perspectives on transformational leadership in the Sanhedrin
Jewish Encyclopedia: Nasi

Honorifics
Ancient Israel and Judah
Jewish royalty
Establishments in the Seleucid Empire
Jewish leadership roles
Sanhedrin